Azarias Friton, O.P. (1563 – 7 January, 1607) was a Roman Catholic prelate who served as Archbishop of Nakhchivan (1604–1607).

Biography
Azarias Friton was born in 1563 and appointed a priest in the Order of Preachers. On 24 March 1604, he was appointed during the papacy of Pope Clement VIII as Archbishop of Nakhchivan. On 9 May 1604, he was consecrated bishop by Girolamo Bernerio, Cardinal-Bishop of Albano, with Agostino Quinzio, Bishop of Korčula, and Leonard Abel, Titular Bishop of Sidon, serving as co-consecrators. He served as Archbishop of Nakhchivan until his death on 7 January 1607.

References 

17th-century Roman Catholic bishops in the Ottoman Empire
Bishops appointed by Pope Clement VIII
1563 births
1607 deaths